Sartaqtai was a son of the first emperor of the Mongol Empire, Genghis Khan. His name was made into a title, meaning "Arslan of the Sart", and was bestowed upon Prince of Karluks.

Given names
Year of birth unknown
Year of death unknown